The Iwakura Mission or Iwakura Embassy (Iwakura Shisetsudan) was a Japanese diplomatic voyage to the United States and Europe conducted between 1871 and 1873 by leading statesmen and scholars of the Meiji period. It was not the only such mission, but it is the most well-known and possibly most significant in terms of its impact on the modernization of Japan after a long period of isolation from the West. The mission was first proposed by the influential Dutch missionary and engineer Guido Verbeck, based to some degree on the model of the Grand Embassy of Peter I.

The aim of the mission was threefold; to gain recognition for the newly reinstated imperial dynasty under the Emperor Meiji; to begin preliminary renegotiation of the unequal treaties with the dominant world powers; and to make a comprehensive study of modern industrial, political, military and educational systems and structures in the United States and Europe.

The Iwakura Mission followed several such missions previously sent by the Shogunate, such as the Japanese Embassy to the United States in 1860, the First Japanese Embassy to Europe in 1862, and the Second Japanese Embassy to Europe in 1863.

Participants
The mission was named after and headed by Iwakura Tomomi in the role of extraordinary and plenipotentiary ambassador, assisted by four vice-ambassadors, three of whom (Ōkubo Toshimichi, Kido Takayoshi, and Itō Hirobumi) were also ministers in the Japanese government. The historian Kume Kunitake as private secretary to Iwakura Tomomi, was the official diarist of the journey. The log of the expedition published in 1878 in five volumes as Tokumei Zenken Taishi Bei-O Kairan Jikki (特命全権大使米欧回覧実記), provided a detailed account of Japanese observations on the United States and rapidly industrializing Western Europe.

Also included in the mission were a number of administrators and scholars, totaling 48 people. In addition to the mission staff, about 53 students and attendants also joined the outward voyage from Yokohama. Several of the students were left behind to complete their education in the foreign countries, including five young women who stayed in the United States to study, including the then 6-year old Tsuda Umeko, who after returning to Japan, founded the Joshi Eigaku Juku (present day Tsuda University) in 1900, Nagai Shigeko, later Baroness Uryū Shigeko, as well as Yamakawa Sutematsu, later Princess Ōyama Sutematsu.

 Kaneko Kentarō was left in the U.S., too, as a student. In 1890 he was introduced to Theodore Roosevelt. They became friends and their relationship resulted later in Roosevelt's mediation at the end of the Russo-Japanese War and the Treaty of Portsmouth.
 Makino Nobuaki, a student member of the mission was to remark in his memoirs: "Together with the abolition of the han system, dispatching the Iwakura Mission to America and Europe must be cited as the most important events that built the foundation of our state after the Restoration."
 Nakae Chōmin, who was a member of the mission staff and the Ministry of Justice, stayed in France to study the French legal system with the radical republican Emile Acollas. Later he became a journalist, thinker and translator and introduced French thinkers like Jean-Jacques Rousseau to Japan.

Itinerary

United States
Arriving in San Francisco on 15 January 1872, the group travelled by train via Salt Lake City and Chicago eventually reaching Washington, D.C. on 29 February. The mission's stay in the United States was extended with an attempt to negotiate new treaty rights, a task that necessitated two members of the party to return to Japan to obtain necessary letters of representation. Members of the Iwakura Mission were keenly interested in observing schools and learning more about educational policy. Tours to schools, universities and industrial locations in Boston, New York and Washington, D.C. were made as a result.

Unsuccessful in their attempts to renegotiate the existing unequal treaties the party eventually set sail for the United Kingdom in August 1872.

United Kingdom
On 17 August 1872 the Iwakura Mission arrived at Liverpool on the Cunard steamer Olympus. Traveling to London via Manchester the party spent much of late August and early September in and around the capital inspecting political, academic and military institutions, visiting the British Museum, travelling on the newly constructed London Underground and attending musical concerts at the Royal Albert Hall. After visits to the Royal dockyards at Portsmouth and a day visit to Brighton, the mission split into smaller groups to visit, among other places, Blair Atholl in the Highlands of Scotland, Edinburgh, the Yorkshire Dales and the industrial centers of Manchester, Glasgow, Edinburgh, Newcastle upon Tyne and Bradford.

Iwakura Tomomi led the Manchester-Liverpool delegation. A visit that culminated on 7 October in a civic reception and banquet where toasts highlighted the leading role of the region in world manufacturing, technology and municipal administration. In Glasgow, as guests of Lord Blantyre, the delegation stayed at Erskine House and given tours of shipbuilding and steel fabrication facilities on banks of the River Clyde.

In Newcastle upon Tyne the group arrived on 21 October staying in the Royal Station Hotel where they met the industrialist Sir William Armstrong. It had been ten years since the Bakufu mission had visited the town, but as a direct result of the visit significant new export orders were obtained for ships and armaments from Tyneside factories.

The gentlemen were attired in ordinary morning costume and except for their complexion and the oriental cast of their features, they could scarcely be distinguished from their English companions.
— Newcastle Daily Chronicle, 23 October 1872

They visited the Elswick Engine and Ordnance Works with Captain Andrew Noble and George Rendell, inspected the hydraulic engines and the boring and turning departments and examined the construction of Armstrong and Gatling guns. They also visited the Gosforth Colliery, descending into the mine itself. Further visits were made to Bolckow and Vaughan Iron Works in Middlesbrough and iron-ore mines in Cleveland. The Newcastle and Gateshead Chamber of Commerce arranged a river trip on the Tyne, taking in the High Level Bridge, the Tharsis Sulphur and Copper Company Hebburn and the Jarrow Chemical Works.

From Newcastle upon Tyne the group travelled to Yorkshire, visiting the open countryside and Bolton Abbey prior to inspecting textile manufacturing facilities at Salts Mill in Saltaire and Dean Clough Mill in Halifax.  Accompanied by the British Envoy to Japan, Sir Harry Smith Parkes, the group toured not only manufacturing facilities but also village accommodation, schools, almshouses, hospitals and parks provided by Sir Titus Salt and Sir John Crossley for their workers.

A visit to Chatsworth House on 30 October was followed by visits to Burton-upon-Trent, Birmingham, Worcester, Stoke on Trent and Chester.

The delegation was presented at an official audience with Queen Victoria at Windsor Castle on 5 December 1872. Another audience with the Prince of Wales took place at Sandringham on 9 December. The party finally left for France on 16 December.

France, Germany, Italy (and a few other parts of Europe) followed by their return to Japan
France, Belgium, the Netherlands, Germany, Denmark, Sweden, Austria, Italy, and Switzerland were all visited by the mission during the first half of 1873. On the return journey, Egypt, Aden, Ceylon, Singapore, Saigon, Hong Kong, and Shanghai were also stopping points en route, although visits in these locations were much shorter. The mission eventually reached Yokohama on 13 September 1873, almost two years after first setting out.

Purpose and results
Of the initial goals of the mission the aim of revision of the unequal treaties was not achieved, prolonging the mission by almost four months, but also impressing the importance of the second goal on its members. The attempts to negotiate new treaties under better conditions with the foreign governments led to criticism of the mission that members were attempting to go beyond the mandate set by the Japanese government. Members of the mission were nonetheless favorably impressed by industrial modernization seen in America and Europe and the experience of the tour provided them a strong impetus to lead similar modernization initiatives on their return.

Commemoration events
 In 1997 a special celebration marked the 125th anniversary of the mission's visit to the north-west of England.  Led by the Centre for Japanese Studies at the University of Manchester in collaboration with the Osaka Chamber of Commerce, a delegation of over 70 leading industrialists visited the Manchester Region.  A Civic Banquet was held in Manchester Town Hall replicating the 1872 Reception.  The Lord Mayor attended and received Ambassadors together with a citation from the Japanese Foreign Minister.  A Civic Plaque commemorating the anniversary of the Iwakura Mission to Manchester was also inaugurated at the site of the original Manchester Town Hall.

See also
 Bernardo the Japanese, the first Japanese to visit Europe, in 1553
 Grand Embassy of Peter I, Russian embassy to Europe
 Tenshō embassy, first Japanese embassy to visit Europe, in 1582
 Hasekura Tsunenaga, a Japanese emissary who led the Keichō Embassy (慶長使節) to Europe between 1613 and 1620
 Japanese Embassy to the United States, in 1860
First Japanese Embassy to Europe (1862)

Citations

General references 
 The official report of the Mission compiled by Kume was published in 1878, entitled Tokumei Zenken Taishi Bei-O Kairan Jikki. It is available in English as: Healey, Graham and Tsuzuki Chushichi, eds, A True Account of the Ambassador Extraordinary & Plenipotentiary's Journey of Observation Through the United States of America and Europe, .
The Iwakura Mission in Britain, 1872 London School of Economics STICERD discussion paper IS/98/349 (March 1998)
 Nish, Ian. (1998) The Iwakura Mission to America and Europe: A New Assessment. Richmond, Surrey: Japan Library. 	; ;  OCLC 40410662

 Japan and the North West of England: A Special Publication to mark the 125th anniversary of the Iwakura Mission, edited by Geoffrey Broad, published by the Greater Manchester Centre for Japanese Studies (September 1997) .

Further reading

External links
Illustrations from the Jikki (Japanese)
About Tsuda Umeko
Images from the mission – "Japan discovers Europe" (German)
   Dinner held at the Revere House hotel, Boston, USA

Foreign relations of the Empire of Japan
Meiji Restoration
19th-century diplomatic conferences
1871 in Japan
1871 in international relations
Japanese embassies to the West